The Cimarron meridian, in longitude 103° west from Greenwich, extends from latitude 36° 30′ to 37° north, and, with the base line in latitude 36° 30′ north, governs the surveys in Oklahoma west of 100° west longitude from Greenwich.

Sources

See also
List of principal and guide meridians and base lines of the United States

External links

Meridians and base lines of the United States
Named meridians
Geography of Oklahoma